David Siegel is currently Chief Executive Officer (CEO) of Meetup. Formerly, he was the CEO of Investopedia.

Siegel became a director at DoubleClick at age 25 and its chief executive officer at 30. He served as the President of SeekingAlpha and a Senior Vice President for 1-800 Flowers. Siegel earned both a Bachelor of Arts in Philosophy, Politics and Economics and an Master of Business Administration (MBA) in Finance and Marketing from the University of Pennsylvania.

References

1970s births
Living people
American chief executives
Wharton School of the University of Pennsylvania alumni